Ralph Lerner (1949 – May 7, 2011) was an American architect, born in New York in 1949. He studied under John Hejduk at Cooper Union. Lerner then worked for Ulrich Franzen and Richard Meier. Lerner obtained a master's degree in architecture at Harvard University in 1975, and joined the University of Virginia faculty.

While based in Charlottesville, Lerner led his own firm, Ralph Lerner, Architecture and Urban Design. From 1979 to 1980, Lerner taught at Polytechnic of Central London. He returned to the United States for a position at Harvard, then accepted an associate professorship at Princeton University in 1983. Ralph Lerner Architect PC was established in Princeton the following year. He was appointed dean of the Princeton University School of Architecture in 1989, two years after becoming a full professor. Lerner was designated George Dutton ’27 Professor of Architecture in 1994, and was succeeded as dean by Stan Allen in 2002. Lerner remained on the Princeton faculty until his 2008 resignation, to assume the deanship of the  Faculty of Architecture at the University of Hong Kong.

Lerner resigned from HKU in April 2011 for health reasons, and returned to the United States. He died in Princeton, New Jersey, of brain cancer on May 7, 2011, aged 61.

References

1949 births
2011 deaths
Architects from New York (state)
20th-century American architects
American university and college faculty deans
Academics of the University of Westminster
Princeton University faculty
Academic staff of the University of Hong Kong
University of Virginia faculty
Cooper Union alumni
Harvard Graduate School of Design alumni
Deaths from brain cancer in the United States
Deaths from cancer in New Jersey
American expatriates in Hong Kong
Architects from New Jersey
Architects from Virginia
American expatriates in the United Kingdom
American expatriate academics
Fellows of the American Institute of Architects